This is a timeline documenting the events of heavy metal in the year 2020.

Bands formed
 Act of Denial
 Bodom After Midnight

Bands disbanded
 Abnormality
 Absu
 All Shall Perish
 Anathema (hiatus)
 Dream On, Dreamer
 Falconer
 Lynch Mob
 Morgoth
 Nachtmystium
 Obey the Brave
 SHVPES
 Slapshock
 Stone Sour (hiatus)
 Unlocking the Truth
 Van Halen

Bands reformed
 Affiance
 The Amenta
 Attack Attack!
 Dark the Suns
 Darkwoods My Betrothed
 Forced Entry
 Genghis Tron
 I, the Breather
 To/Die/For
 Trail of Tears
 Vektor

Deaths
 January 7 – Neil Peart, drummer of Rush, died from brain cancer at the age of 67.
 January 24 – Joe Payne, former bassist of Nile and Divine Heresy, died from undisclosed reasons at the age of 35.
 January 24 – Sean Reinert, former drummer of Cynic and Death, died from undisclosed reasons at the age of 48.
 January 26 – Santtu Lonka, former drummer of To/Die/For, died from undisclosed reasons at the age of 41.
 January 27 – Reed Mullin, drummer of Corrosion of Conformity, died from undisclosed reasons at the age of 53.
 January 31 – Josh Pappe, former bassist of D.R.I. and Gang Green, died from undisclosed reasons at the age of 53.
 February 6 – Diego Farias, former guitarist of Volumes, died from undisclosed reasons at the age of 27.
 February 24 – Justin Frear, former guitarist of Ultimatum, died from a heart attack at the age of 47.
 March 7 – Mikro Virdis former drummer of Trick or Treat, died from a car crash at the age of 38.
 March 16 – Jason Rainey, former guitarist of Sacred Reich, died from a heart attack at the age of 53.
 March 24 – Bill Rieflin, former drummer of Ministry, KMFDM, and Revolting Cocks, died from cancer at the age of 59.
 March 28 – Lou A. Kouvaris, former guitarist of Riot, died from COVID-19 at the age of 66.
 April 21 – Derek Jones, guitarist of Falling in Reverse, died from undisclosed reasons at the age of 35.
 April 26 – McKenzie Bell, former guitarist of He Is Legend, died from undisclosed reasons at the age of 35.
 April 28 – Bob Fouts, former drummer of the Gates of Slumber and Burn It Down, died from undisclosed reasons at the age of 45.
 May 28 – Bob Kulick, former session guitarist of Kiss and W.A.S.P., died from heart disease at the age of 70.
 June 1 - Joey Image, former drummer of Misfits, died from liver cancer at the age of 63.
 June 9 – Paul Chapman, former guitarist of UFO and Waysted, died from undisclosed reasons at the age of 66.
 June 16 – Yuji "You" Adachi, guitarist of Dead End, died from sepsis at the age of 56.
 July 16 – Jamie Oldaker, former drummer of Frehley's Comet, died from cancer at the age of 68.
 August 4 – Tony Costanza, former drummer of Machine Head and Crowbar, died from undisclosed reasons at the age of 52.
 August 7 – Alan Peters, former bassist of Agnostic Front, died from undisclosed reasons at the age of 55.
 August 9 – Martin Birch, producer and engineer for albums by Iron Maiden, Black Sabbath and Deep Purple, died from undisclosed reasons at the age of 71.
 August 14 – Pete Way, former bassist of UFO, Michael Schenker Group, Fastway and Waysted, died from life-threatening injuries at the age of 69.
 August 18 – Jack Sherman, former guitarist of Red Hot Chili Peppers, died from undisclosed reasons at the age of 64.
 August 20 – Frankie Banali, drummer of Quiet Riot and former drummer of W.A.S.P., died from pancreatic cancer at the age of 68.
 August 24 – Riley Gale, vocalist of Power Trip, died from undisclosed reasons at the age of 34.
 August 25 – Enrique Maseda, vocalist of NJ Bloodline, died from undisclosed reasons.
 August 31 – Jay White, bassist of the Agony Scene, died from undisclosed reasons.
 September 5 – Greg Messick, guitarist of Intruder, died from undisclosed reasons at the age of 55.
 September 19 – Lee Kerslake, former drummer of Ozzy Osbourne and Uriah Heep, died from prostate cancer at the age of 73.
 September 25 – Brent Young, former bassist of Trivium, died from undisclosed reasons at the age of 37.
 September 26 – Mark Stone, former bassist of Van Halen, died from cancer.
 September 28 – Donny Hillier, vocalist of Trauma, died from undisclosed reasons.
 October 6 – Eddie Van Halen, guitarist of Van Halen, died from throat cancer at the age of 65.
 November 4 – Ken Hensley, former keyboardist of Uriah Heep, died from undisclosed reasons at the age of 75.
 November 25 – Aaron Melzer, former vocalist of Secrets, died from undisclosed reasons.
 November 26 – Jamir Garcia, vocalist of Slapshock, died from committing suicide by hanging at the age of 42.
 December 9 – Sean Malone, bassist of Cynic, died from committing suicide at the age of 50.
 December 22 – Leslie West, vocalist and guitarist of Mountain, died from cardiac arrest at the age of 75.
 December 29 – Alexi Laiho, vocalist and guitarist of Children of Bodom and Bodom After Midnight, died from alcohol-induced degeneration of the liver at the age of 41.

Albums released

January

February

March

April

May

June

July

August

September

October

November

December

References

Heavy Metal
2020s in heavy metal music